15 Inolvidables may refer to:

 15 Inolvidables, an album by Marco Antonio Solís
 15 Inolvidables Vol. 2, an album by Marco Antonio Solís
 15 Inolvidables by Grupo Pegasso
 15 Inolvidables Éxitos by Lola Beltrán
 15 Inolvidables Éxitos by Tito Rodríguez
 15 Inolvidables de Siempre by Grupo Bryndis
 15 Inolvidables en la Voz de by Agustin Lara
 15 Inolvidables en la Voz de by Rebeca Pous Del Toro
 Las 15 Inolvidables de by Pedro Infante
 15 Éxitos Inolvidables de by José Alfredo Jiménez